Anders Eide (born 7 March 1971 in Snåsa) is a Norwegian cross-country skier who has competed since 1992. His best World Cup finish was seventh twice, earning them both in 1996.

Eide also competed in at the 1998 Winter Olympics in Nagano where he finished 11th in the 50 km event. His best finish at the FIS Nordic World Ski Championships was 12th in the 50 km event at Thunder Bay in 1995.

His club was Snåsa IL.

Cross-country skiing results
All results are sourced from the International Ski Federation (FIS).

Olympic Games

World Championships

World Cup

Season standings

Team podiums
 2 victories 
 8 podiums

References

External links

1971 births
Living people
People from Snåsa
Cross-country skiers at the 1998 Winter Olympics
Norwegian male cross-country skiers
Olympic cross-country skiers of Norway
Sportspeople from Trøndelag